Glad to Be Unhappy is an album recorded by American jazz saxophonist Paul Desmond featuring performances recorded in 1964 (with one track from 1963) which were released on the RCA Victor label.

Reception

Allmusic awarded the album 4 stars stating "At first glance, Desmond may seem only peripherally involved with the music-making, keeping emotion at a cool, intellectual arms' length, yet his exceptionally pure tone and ruminative moods wear very well over the long haul. ...A lovely recording, though not the best album in the Desmond/Hall collaboration".

Track listing
 "Glad to Be Unhappy" (Richard Rodgers, Lorenz Hart) - 5:47
 "Poor Butterfly" (Raymond Hubbell, John Golden) - 7:20
 "Stranger in Town" (Mel Tormé) - 6:27
 "A Taste of Honey" (Ric Marlow, Bobby Scott) - 4:29 	
 "Any Other Time" (Paul Desmond) - 5:26
 "Hi-Lili, Hi-Lo" (Bronisław Kaper, Helen Deutsch) - 4:43
 "Angel Eyes" (Matt Dennis, Earl Brent) - 6:22
 "By the River Sainte Marie" (Harry Warren, Edgar Leslie) - 6:17 Bonus track on CD reissue 
 "All Across the City" (Jim Hall) - 4:34 Bonus track on CD reissue 
 "All Through the Night" (Cole Porter) - 5:26 Bonus track on CD reissue  
Recorded at Webster Hall in New York City on June 10, 1963 (track 2) and at  RCA Studio A in New York City on  July 13, 1964 (track 7), July 14, 1964 (track 4), August 20, 1964 (track 5), September 4, 1964 (tracks 3 & 8), September 8, 1964 (tracks 1 & 6) and September 16, 1964 (tracks 9 & 10).

Personnel
Paul Desmond - alto saxophone
Jim Hall - guitar 
Gene Cherico (track 2), Eugene Wright (tracks 1 & 3-10) - bass
Connie Kay - drums

References

Paul Desmond albums
1965 albums
RCA Records albums
Albums produced by George Avakian